Martha Mitchell (died December 14, 2011) was an American librarian and archivist. She was the longtime archivist at Brown University and author of Encyclopedia Brunoniana, a reference work on Brown's history.

A native of Pawtucket, Rhode Island, she attended Tufts University and earned a degree in library science from McGill University. She began working at Brown as a librarian in 1949 and led the archives from the 1960s until her retirement in 2003.

She became known as the university's "unofficial historian" and "trivia whiz," with an "encyclopedic mind [that] was filled with all things Brown."

References 

Brown University staff
American librarians
American archivists
American women librarians
Female archivists
2011 deaths
Year of birth missing
20th-century American women
21st-century American women
Tufts University alumni
McGill University alumni
People from Pawtucket, Rhode Island